Metse is a Tibetan film directed by Sonam Wangdue. The film was financed by Lama Khube Rinpoche, and is the maiden production by the Tibetan Arts and Film Production (TAFP).  The script was written by Tenzin Gather. The film title translates as ‘The Life’ in English, and depicts the struggles of a Tibetan refugee family in India.

The film is devoid of the usual theme of the political challenges  of Tibetan exiles, and focuses more on the down-to-earth portrayal of the life of Tibetan refugees in general, and in particular, two families who are involved through the marriage of their children.

Metse was released as a DVD in 2008 in the Bylakupee Tibetan settlement in 2008.

References

Tibetan-language films
2008 films